The 2016 West Virginia Republican presidential primary was held on May 10 in the U.S. state of West Virginia as one of the Republican Party's primaries ahead of the 2016 presidential election. The only candidate on the ballot who had not withdrawn was Donald Trump.

Both the Democratic Party and the Libertarian Party hold their own West Virginia primaries on the same day.

Opinion polling

Results

References

West Virginia
Republican primary
West Virginia Republican primaries